This city was once a capital of Baekje. This museum displays and preserves the relics excavated from the site where there had been Mireuksaji Buddhist temple before in Iksan, South Korea. It holds different cultural events and summer school for students. Through this, it puts a lot of effort to  be a national museum. Also it runs various exhibitions and seminars. It opens from 9am to 6pm on weekdays, and it closes on every Monday and the first of January of every year.

References 

Museums in North Jeolla Province
Iksan
Museums established in 1994
1994 establishments in South Korea